Georgiavania is the only studio album by American hip hop duo Willie Isz. It was released on June 15, 2009, via Lex Records. Production was entirely handled by member Jneiro Jarel (under his beatmaking alias Dr. Who Dat?). It features contributions from Gloria Ryann and Tunde Adebimpe.

At AnyDecentMusic?, which assigns a normalized rating out of 10 to reviews from mainstream publications, the album received an average score of 6.9, based on six reviews.

Track listing

Personnel
Omar "Jneiro Jarel" Gilyard – rap vocals, backing vocals (tracks: 2, 3, 5-8, 10, 11, 13), synth guitar (tracks: 2, 5, 6, 12, 13), producer, recording, mixing
Willie Edward "Khujo" Knighton Jr. – rap vocals
Babatunde Omoroga Adebimpe – vocals (track 5)
Gloria Ryann – vocals (track 7)
Jake Morelli – additional guitar (tracks: 2, 5)
Lamont "Managan" Fountain – additional guitar (track 6), recording, mixing (tracks: 1-11, 13)
David "DJ Kiva" Luz – additional guitar (track 13)
Ray Murray – recording (tracks: 2-4, 7-11)
James Jarvis – artwork

References

External links

2009 debut albums
Willie Isz albums
Lex Records albums
Jneiro Jarel albums
Hip hop albums by American artists